Thenkaraikottai is a ruined castle was built by Seelappa Nayakkar and Chennappa Nayakkar of Vijayanagar dynasty.  This castle is the only one built on land and not on a hill like others and is situated near Pappireddipatti, Dharmapuri district, Tamil Nadu, India. There is a temple which is dedicated to lord Rama (avatar of vishnu) with beautiful architecture and with some ruined historic buildings which includes Granaries, stables for elephants and horses, cannons, a bathing area for the princes and more.

Kalyana Ramaswamy temple
 
Kalyana Ramaswamy temple is the temple present in Thenkaraikottai. This temple was built by Seelappa Nayakkar and Chennappa Nayakkar  of Vijayaagar dynasty during 14th century and filled with wonderful architecture and is administered and maintained by the Hindu Religious and Charitable Endowments Department of the Government of Tamil Nadu. This a very old temple and is very big almost 40 acres.

There were many ruins in the temple and were said to take care by the government and then had been taken measures later at 2019 and had been reported by many media channels.

Significance
This temple has beautiful sculptures and pillars produce the seven Svaras of the Indian classical music which is only present some temples like the Vitthala temple in Hampi and in Nellaiappar Temple in Tirunelveli. This temple is the oldest in the area and has one shiva temple in the fort complex. This temple's moola garbagriha has twelve moolavars in the form of Pattabishekam and kalyanam and arranged in  fantastic form. The Lord is in a seated posture which is seen only in some temples.

 

Forts in Tamil Nadu
Dharmapuri district
Vishnu temples